Kim Hwan-hee (born August 25, 2002) is a South Korean actress. She began her career as a child actress in 2008, and has been active ever since. She has starred in television dramas such as Invincible Lee Pyung Kang (2009), Believe in Love (2010), My One and Only (2010), and You Are the Best! (2013), as well as the films Born to Sing (2013) and The Wailing (2016).

Filmography

Film

Television series

Ambassadorship 
 Public relations ambassador Seoul International Children's Film Festival (2022)

Awards and nominations

References

External links
 Kim Hwan-hee at Namoo Actors 
 
 
 
 

2002 births
Living people
South Korean child actresses
South Korean television actresses
South Korean film actresses